Anita Avramides is a British philosopher whose work focuses on the philosophy of language, and the philosophy of the mind. She is a reader at the University of Oxford, based at St. Hilda's College, where she is Southover Manor Trust Tutorial Fellow in Philosophy. Since 2014, she has served as Vice Chair of the Philosophy Faculty at Oxford.

Career
Avramides has worked on the philosophy of language, and the philosophy of the mind, most recently focusing on the knowledge of other minds. For Avramides, this question is at the intersection of the philosophy of mind, epistemology, and metaphysics. She believes that the 'problem' of other minds is conceptual, rather than epistemological.

Avramides is Southover Manor Trust Fellow in Philosophy, at St Hilda's College, Oxford. She has also been a full-time lecturer at The Queen's College, Oxford, and a visiting lecturer at Bedford College, London. 
 
She has held part-time lecturer positions at Balliol College, Exeter College and Oriel College, Oxford.

Education
Avramides received her doctorate (D.Phil.) from the University of Oxford, Somerville and Queen's College. She did her M.Phil. from University College London, and completed her undergraduate BA degree from Oberlin College, United States.

Publications
Books
 Meaning and Mind: An Examination of a Gricean Account of Language MIT Press, 1989, 
 
 Women of Ideas (ed.) (1995) Duckworth.

References

Living people
British women philosophers
Place of birth missing (living people)
Alumni of University College London
Alumni of The Queen's College, Oxford
Alumni of Somerville College, Oxford
Oberlin College alumni
Year of birth missing (living people)